Purgatoire means purgatory in French. It may refer to:

 Purgatoire River, a river in southeastern Colorado, United States
 Purgatoire Formation, a geological unit named for the river
 Purgatoire River track site, a significant preservation of dinosaur trackways

See also 
 Purgatory (disambiguation)
 Purgatorio (disambiguation)